The Boatright House in Hopkinsville, Kentucky, located off U.S. Route 41, was built in 1808.  It was listed on the National Register of Historic Places in 1979.

It is significant as one of just two stone houses in Christian County.  It is a one-story, two-room building (as is the other).

References

National Register of Historic Places in Christian County, Kentucky
Houses completed in 1808
Hopkinsville, Kentucky
1808 establishments in Kentucky
Houses on the National Register of Historic Places in Kentucky
Houses in Christian County, Kentucky